The Sand Island Light is a lighthouse located on the northern tip of Sand Island, one of the Apostle Islands, in Lake Superior in Bayfield County, Wisconsin, near the city of Bayfield.

The Lighthouse Board chose to use a design that had been used on McGulpin Point Light in 1868; Eagle Harbor Light in 1871; and White River Light in 1875.

Currently owned by the National Park Service and part of the Apostle Islands National Lakeshore, it was added to the National Register of Historic Places in 1977, part of reference number 77000145. Listed in the Library of Congress Historic American Buildings Survey, WI-313.

Attached to the lighthouse is a Norman gothic keepers quarters.

History
In 1871, the Lighthouse Board asked Congress for funds to construct a lighthouse on Sand Island to both better guide ships toward the Raspberry Island Light and mark the Western edge of the Apostle Islands. However, Congress rejected the request for this and the next six years. In 1880, Congress finally agreed to erect a lighthouse, and sent an engineer to begin planning for the construction of the station. Sand Island Light was built from the same designs as three other lighthouses, but with the local Apostle Islands Brownstone instead of brick. The masons opened a hole for the cellar, and then began building the  dwelling, and added the  tower in the Western corner of the structure. As the lighthouse neared completion, a fixed white Fourth Order Fresnel lens was placed in the lantern room. An acting keeper was appointed, and the light was first lit on September 25, 1881. The acting keeper, Charles Lederle, was appointed permanent keeper the next year.

Eventually, Lederle grew weary of the isolation that came with being the keeper of an island lighthouse and was reappointed the keeper of Two Harbors Light in Minnesota. The first assistant on nearby Outer Island, Emmanuel Luick, was offered the position of keeper at the Sand Island Light, and moved in with his wife Ella during January 1892. In 1901, Luick fell ill, leaving all duties at the lighthouse for Ella. Although she managed to do everything, the incident pointed out the dangers of having a single keeper on Sand Island. The Lighthouse Board authorized the addition of an assistant keeper and on May 22, 1902, Henry Irvine moved onto the island. In October 1903, Irvine was transferred to Devils Island. Luick appointed his wife as his acting assistant keeper, but the following day Edward Derry arrived on the island as the new assistant keeper. On April 30, 1904, Derry resigned, leaving Ella as acting assistant keeper once again. Ten days later, Frederick Hudson arrived on the island to take over as assistant keeper. On May 9, 1905, Ella boarded a steamer for nearby Bayfield and never returned to the island or her husband again.

Luick married again, this time to a woman named Oramill, and with her served the Sand Island Light for the next sixteen years. Over the course of that time, Luick went through twelve assistants, with the longest tenure being only two years. By the end of the 1910s, local shipping patterns had changing, and the Sand Island Light became less important. In 1921, the Lighthouse Board automated the tower, and Luick was reassigned to Grand Marais Light in Minnesota.

In 1933, the automated light was dismantled, and the Coast Guard constructed a  steel tower in front of the lighthouse. The automated light was placed on top until 1985, when the light was placed back in the lighthouse and the tower was removed.

Getting there
Most of the Apostle Islands light stations may be reached on the Apostle Islands Cruise Service water taxi or by private boat during the summer. During the Annual Apostle Island Lighthouse Celebration ferry tour service is available for all the lighthouses. In the tourist season, volunteer park rangers are on many of the islands to greet visitors.

See also 
Wisconsin lighthouses
Apostle Islands Lighthouses

References

Further reading
 Havighurst, Walter (1943) The Long Ships Passing: The Story of the Great Lakes, Macmillan Publishers.
 Oleszewski, Wes, Great Lakes Lighthouses, American and Canadian: A Comprehensive Directory/Guide to Great Lakes Lighthouses, (Gwinn, Michigan: Avery Color Studios, Inc., 1998) .
 
 Wright, Larry and Wright, Patricia, Great Lakes Lighthouses Encyclopedia Hardback (Erin: Boston Mills Press, 2006) .

External links

 Aerial photos of Sand Island Light, Marina.com.
Library of Congress Historic American Buildings Survey Survey number HABS WI-313
 

Lighthouses completed in 1881
Houses completed in 1881
Apostle Islands National Lakeshore
Buildings and structures in Bayfield County, Wisconsin
Lighthouses on the National Register of Historic Places in Wisconsin
Tourist attractions in Bayfield County, Wisconsin
National Register of Historic Places in Bayfield County, Wisconsin
1881 establishments in Wisconsin